Charles Clark (born August 10, 1987) is an American sprinter, who specializes in the 200 metres. His personal best time is 20.22 seconds, but he also ran a 20.00 at the 2009 USA Outdoor Championships, for 2nd place, qualifying him for the World Championships to be held in Berlin, Germany, where he finished 6th in the final of the 200m.

Clark was voted an All-USA boys high school track selection by USA Today.

He attended Florida State University.

References

External links
Official bio at Florida State

Track & Field Bio at USATF

1987 births
Living people
American male sprinters
African-American male track and field athletes
Florida State Seminoles men's track and field athletes
People from Virginia
21st-century African-American sportspeople
20th-century African-American people